John Albert Grant (8 September 1924 – 1999) was an English professional footballer who played for Everton, Rochdale and Southport.

Between 1946 and 1954 he made a total of 133 appearances for the Everton.

References

1924 births
English footballers
Association football defenders
English Football League players
Everton F.C. players
Rochdale A.F.C. players
Southport F.C. players
1999 deaths